Mutinta Christine Mazoka (born 1949) is a Zambian politician. She was the member of the National Assembly of Zambia for Pemba Constituency from 2011 to 2021.

Biography 
Mutinta Christine Mazoka was born in 1949.

She was married to Anderson Mazoka, the founder of the United Party for National Development, who died in 2006. The couple met in 1975 and married the following year. They had three children: Mutinta, Pasina, and Anderson Jr.

Mazoka is a member of her late husband's UPND. She was elected in 2011 to represent the constituency of Pemba in the National Assembly of Zambia. She was the first woman to represent the district since the country's independence in 1964. In 2016, she was reelected to Zambia's parliament. She elected to leave office in 2021.

As of 2019, she represented Zambia in the African Union's Pan-African Parliament.

Mazoka owns and operates a farm, and holds a certificate in agriculture.

References 

1949 births
United Party for National Development politicians
Members of the National Assembly of Zambia
21st-century Zambian women politicians
21st-century Zambian politicians
Members of the Pan-African Parliament from Zambia
Living people